Manvel Gamburyan (born May 8, 1981) is an Armenian mixed martial artist who has competed in the UFC's lightweight, featherweight, and bantamweight divisions. A professional competitor since 1999, he was a cast member of Spike TV's The Ultimate Fighter 5, and also competed in World Extreme Cagefighting (WEC) and King of the Cage (KOTC).

Background
In May 1991, Gamburyan's family relocated from Armenia to the United States. Shortly after his arrival, he began training in judo at Gokor Chivichyan and Gene LeBell's Hayastan MMA Academy, quickly becoming one of the top judokan in the country, winning junior nationals less than two years later. He went on to win junior nationals eight times, the junior Olympics once, and was a member of the 2000 Junior World Team. Later, Gamburyan also began training in Kyokushin Karate at age of 15.

Mixed martial arts career

Early career
Gamburyan began his career in mixed martial arts in 1999 at the age of 17. He won his first four fights, then lost a decision to future UFC Lightweight Champion Sean Sherk in 2001. Gamburyan's cousin Karo Parisyan nicknamed him "The Pitbull" for the tenacity he displayed in the fight.

The Ultimate Fighter
In 2007, Gamburyan appeared on the reality show The Ultimate Fighter 5, fighting on Jens Pulver's team. His nickname was changed to "Anvil" for his UFC career because "Pitbull" was already taken by other UFC fighters such as Andrei Arlovski and Thiago Alves.

Gamburyan defeated Noah Thomas by kimura lock in the preliminary round. In his next matchup, Gamburyan defeated Matt Wiman to advance to the semifinal round.

In the semifinal round, Gamburyan beat Joe Lauzon in a unanimous decision and advanced to the finale with Nate Diaz. He was considered an underdog in each of his fights, in part due to his short stature. After the Lauzon fight, UFC president Dana White personally apologized to Gamburyan for doubting him. In the finale, Gamburyan controlled Diaz for the majority of the fight, but was forced to tap out in the second round after dislocating his right shoulder on an unsuccessful takedown attempt. Although this technically counts as a submission due to injury, Gamburyan has never been submitted by an opponent in his MMA career.

Ultimate Fighting Championship
Despite losing the show, Gamburyan secured a UFC contract with his performance. He won his next two UFC fights, defeating Nate Mohr by ankle lock at UFC 79 and Jeff Cox by guillotine choke at UFC Fight Night 13. Gamburyan raised some controversy in the Cox fight by delivering a spinning leg kick after feigning the mutual tap of gloves that is often seen at the beginning of the match. The crowd in attendance reacted with heavy booing.

He returned to action at UFC 87 and was knocked out in 12 seconds by Rob Emerson.

At UFC 94, Gamburyan lost to Thiago Tavares in a back and forth fight via unanimous decision (29-28, 29–28, 29–28).

World Extreme Cagefighting
After his loss to Tavares, Gamburyan decided to drop down to the featherweight division and fight in the Zuffa-owned WEC.

Gamburyan's first fight at featherweight was a decision win over John Franchi at WEC 41.

Gamburyan defeated Leonard Garcia on November 18, 2009, at WEC 44 via unanimous decision.

Gamburyan fought former WEC Featherweight Champion Mike Brown at WEC 48. He won by knockout in the first round as well as getting the Knockout of the Night bonus of $65,000.

Gamburyan lost via second-round KO to José Aldo in a bout for the WEC Featherweight Championship on September 30, 2010, at WEC 51.

UFC return
On October 28, 2010, World Extreme Cagefighting merged with the Ultimate Fighting Championship. As part of the merger, all WEC fighters were transferred to the UFC.

Gamburyan was expected to face Raphael Assunção on March 19, 2011, at UFC 128, but was forced out of the bout with a back injury and replaced by Erik Koch.

Gamburyan next faced Tyson Griffin on June 26, 2011, at UFC on Versus 4. He lost the fight via majority decision.

Gamburyan was expected to face Diego Nunes on September 24, 2011, at UFC 135, but was forced to withdraw from the bout after suffering a shoulder injury. The bout ultimately took place at UFC 141 and Gamburyan lost via unanimous decision.

Gamburyan defeated Michihiro Omigawa via unanimous decision on August 4, 2012, at UFC on FOX 4.

Gamburyan was expected to face Chad Mendes on February 23, 2013, at UFC 157. However, Gamburyan was forced out of the bout with a thumb injury. Mendes was then pulled from the card as a suitable replacement could not be found on short notice.

Gamburyan was expected to face Hacran Dias on May 18, 2013, at UFC on FX 8. However, Gamburyan was forced to pull out of the bout citing another injury and was replaced by Nik Lentz.

Gamburyan faced Cole Miller on August 17, 2013, at UFC Fight Night 26. Gamburyan won the fight via unanimous decision.

Gamburyan faced Dennis Siver on December 28, 2013, at UFC 168. He lost the fight via unanimous decision. Subsequently, Siver failed a post fight drug screening, testing positive for banned substances. As a result, the decision was changed to a "No Contest".

Gamburyan faced Nik Lentz on May 10, 2014, at UFC Fight Night 40. He lost the fight via unanimous decision.

Gamburyan faced Cody Gibson in a bantamweight bout on September 27, 2014, at UFC 178. He won the fight via submission in the second round.

Gamburyan was expected to face Aljamain Sterling on April 18, 2015, at UFC on Fox 15. However, Gamburyan pulled out of the bout citing injury and was replaced by Takeya Mizugaki.

Gamburyan faced Scott Jorgensen on July 15, 2015, at UFC Fight Night 71. He won the fight via unanimous decision.

Gamburyan next faced John Dodson on April 16, 2016, at UFC on Fox 19. Gamburyan lost the fight via TKO in the first round.

Gamburyan was expected to face Alejandro Pérez on September 17, 2016, at UFC Fight Night 94. However, Gamburyan pulled out of the fight in mid-August for undisclosed personal reasons and was replaced by Albert Morales.

Gamburyan lost to Johnny Eduardo on November 19, 2016, at UFC Fight Night 100 by 2nd-round TKO. Gamburyan then announced his retirement.

Less than two years into his retirement, Gamburyan appeared on Ariel and the Bad Guy Show and revealed he is returning from retirement and planning to enter competition in mid-2019.

Personal life
Gamburyan is also one of Ronda Rousey's main coaches. They met through judo/Hayastan MMA Academy.

Championships and accomplishments
Ultimate Fighting Championship
The Ultimate Fighter 5 Lightweight Runner-Up
World Extreme Cagefighting
Knockout of the Night (One time)

Mixed martial arts record

|-
|Loss
|align=center|15–10 (1)
|Johnny Eduardo
|TKO (punches)
|UFC Fight Night: Bader vs. Nogueira 2
|
|align=center|2
|align=center|0:46
|São Paulo, Brazil
|
|-
|Loss
|align=center|15–9 (1)
|John Dodson
|TKO (punches)
|UFC on Fox: Teixeira vs. Evans
|
|align=center|1
|align=center|0:37
|Tampa, Florida, United States
|
|-
|Win
|align=center| 15–8 (1)
|Scott Jorgensen
| Decision (unanimous)
|UFC Fight Night: Mir vs. Duffee
|
|align=center| 3
|align=center| 5:00
|San Diego, California, United States
|
|-
|Win
|align=center|14–8 (1)
|Cody Gibson
|Submission (guillotine choke)
|UFC 178
|
|align=center|2
|align=center|4:56
| Las Vegas, Nevada, United States
| 
|-
|Loss
|align=center|13–8 (1)
|Nik Lentz
|Decision (unanimous)
|UFC Fight Night: Brown vs. Silva
|
|align=center|3
|align=center|5:00
|Cincinnati, Ohio, United States
|
|-
|NC
|align=center| 13–7 (1)
|Dennis Siver
|NC (overturned)
|UFC 168
|
|align=center|3
|align=center|5:00
|Las Vegas, Nevada, United States
|
|-
|Win
|align=center| 13–7
|Cole Miller
|Decision (unanimous)
|UFC Fight Night: Shogun vs. Sonnen
|
|align=center| 3
|align=center| 5:00
|Boston, Massachusetts, United States
|
|-
|Win
|align=center| 12–7
|Michihiro Omigawa
|Decision (unanimous)
|UFC on Fox: Shogun vs. Vera
|
|align=center| 3
|align=center| 5:00
|Los Angeles, California, United States
|
|-
|Loss
|align=center| 11–7
|Diego Nunes
|Decision (unanimous)
|UFC 141
|
|align=center| 3
|align=center| 5:00
|Las Vegas, Nevada, United States
|
|-
|Loss
|align=center| 11–6
|Tyson Griffin
|Decision (majority)
|UFC Live: Kongo vs. Barry
|
|align=center| 3
|align=center| 5:00
|Pittsburgh, Pennsylvania, United States
|
|-
|Loss
|align=center| 11–5
|José Aldo
|KO (punches)
|WEC 51
|
|align=center| 2
|align=center| 1:32
|Broomfield, Colorado, United States
|
|-
|Win
|align=center| 11–4
|Mike Brown
|KO (punches)
|WEC 48
|
|align=center| 1
|align=center| 2:22
|Sacramento, California, United States
|
|-
|Win
|align=center| 10–4
|Leonard Garcia
|Decision (unanimous)
|WEC 44
|
|align=center| 3
|align=center| 5:00
|Las Vegas, Nevada, United States
|
|-
|Win
|align=center| 9–4
|John Franchi
|Decision (unanimous)
|WEC 41
|
|align=center| 3
|align=center| 5:00
|Sacramento, California, United States
|
|-
|Loss
|align=center| 8–4
|Thiago Tavares
|Decision (unanimous)
|UFC 94
|
|align=center| 3
|align=center| 5:00
|Las Vegas, Nevada, United States
|
|-
|Loss
|align=center| 8–3
|Rob Emerson
|KO (punches)
|UFC 87
|
|align=center| 1
|align=center| 0:12
|Minneapolis, Minnesota, United States
|
|-
|Win
|align=center| 8–2
|Jeff Cox
|Submission (guillotine choke)
|UFC Fight Night: Florian vs. Lauzon
|
|align=center| 1
|align=center| 1:41
|Broomfield, Colorado, United States
|
|-
|Win
|align=center| 7–2
|Nate Mohr
|Submission (achilles lock)
|UFC 79
|
|align=center| 1
|align=center| 1:31
|Las Vegas, Nevada, United States
|
|-
|Loss
|align=center| 6–2
|Nate Diaz
|Submission (shoulder injury)
|The Ultimate Fighter 5 Finale
|
|align=center| 2
|align=center| 0:20
|Las Vegas, Nevada, United States
|
|-
|Win
|align=center| 6–1
|Sammy Morgan
|Decision (unanimous)
|RSF: Shooto Challenge 2
|
|align=center| 3
|align=center| 5:00
|Belleville, Illinois, United States
|
|-
|Win
|align=center| 5–1
|Jorge Santiago
|KO (punch)
|KOTC 27: Aftermath
|
|align=center| 1
|align=center| 0:21
|San Jacinto, California, United States
|
|-
|Loss
|align=center| 4–1
|Sean Sherk
|Decision (unanimous)
|Reality Submission Fighting 3
|
|align=center| 1
|align=center| 18:00
|Belleville, Illinois, United States
|
|-
|Win
|align=center| 4–0
|Pat Benson
|Submission (guillotine choke)
|Reality Submission Fighting 2
|
|align=center| 1
|align=center| 2:01
|Belleville, Illinois, United States
|
|-
|Win
|align=center| 3–0
|Darren Bryant
|Submission (heel hook)
|Kage Kombat 14
|
|align=center| 1
|align=center| 0:35
|Los Angeles, California, United States
|
|-
|Win
|align=center| 2–0
|Timothy Morris
|Technical Submission (choke)
|Kage Kombat 12
|
|align=center| 1
|align=center| 0:16
|Los Angeles, California, United States
|
|-
|Win
|align=center| 1–0
|Danny Henderson
|Submission (armbar)
|Kage Kombat 12
|
|align=center| 1
|align=center| 0:17
|Los Angeles, California, United States
|

Mixed martial arts exhibition record

|-
|Win
|align=center|3–0
|Joe Lauzon
|Decision (unanimous)
|The Ultimate Fighter 5
| (air date)
|align=center|3
|align=center|5:00
|Las Vegas, Nevada, United States
|
|-
|Win
|align=center|2–0
|Matt Wiman
|Decision (unanimous)
|The Ultimate Fighter 5
| (air date)
|align=center|2
|align=center|5:00
|Las Vegas, Nevada, United States
|
|-
|Win
|align=center|1–0
|Noah Thomas
|Submission (kimura)
|The Ultimate Fighter 5
| (air date)
|align=center|1
|align=center|2:10
|Las Vegas, Nevada, United States
|

See also
 List of male mixed martial artists

References

External links
Anvil Official website
Official UFC Profile

The Ultimate Fighter 5 Bio

1981 births
Living people
Armenian male mixed martial artists
American male mixed martial artists
Featherweight mixed martial artists
Lightweight mixed martial artists
Armenian practitioners of Brazilian jiu-jitsu
American practitioners of Brazilian jiu-jitsu
Armenian male judoka
American male judoka
Armenian male karateka
American male karateka
Armenian sambo practitioners
American sambo practitioners
Sportspeople from Gyumri
People from Hollywood, Los Angeles
Mixed martial artists from California
Mixed martial artists utilizing judo
Mixed martial artists utilizing Kyokushin kaikan
Mixed martial artists utilizing Brazilian jiu-jitsu
American people of Armenian descent
Armenian emigrants to the United States
Ultimate Fighting Championship male fighters
21st-century Armenian people